Route 47, locally known as Logan Avenue, is a city route in Winnipeg, Manitoba, Canada. It runs from Route 90 (King Edward Street) to Route 42 (the Disraeli Freeway).  It is primarily a collector road through industrial and older residential areas of north-central Winnipeg.

Route 47 runs just south of and parallel to Canadian Pacific Railway's Winnipeg Yard.

Logan Avenue is named after Robert Logan, a prominent administrator who worked for the North West Company at the Red River Settlement.

Route Description
Logan Avenue is an undivided four lane collector road, with a speed limit of 50 km/h (30 mph) for its entire length.

Major Intersections

From west to east; all intersections are at-grade unless otherwise indicated:

References

047